The Milford–Montague Toll Bridge (also known as the US 206 Toll Bridge) is a truss bridge crossing the Delaware River, connecting Montague Township, New Jersey to Dingman Township, Pennsylvania on U.S. Route 206, near the town of Milford. The two-lane bridge, which opened on December 30, 1953, has a total length of 1,150 feet (350 m), and is operated by the Delaware River Joint Toll Bridge Commission. Tolls are collected only from motorists traveling northbound, into Pennsylvania.

Toll information

Frequent commuters qualify for a 20% discount off the regular E-ZPass rate.

Bridge history
The bridge was approved in 1951, to replace an existing crossing at the site that dated from 1889. The Delaware Water Gap Toll Bridge, the Portland–Columbia Toll Bridge and the Milford–Montague Toll Bridge were all constructed simultaneously by the Delaware River Joint Toll Bridge Commission, with work on all three started on October 15, 1951, and all three bridge openings spaced approximately every two weeks in December 1953.

See also
 
 
 
 
 List of crossings of the Delaware River

References

External links

 Delaware River Joint Toll Bridge Commission

Delaware River Joint Toll Bridge Commission
1953 establishments in New Jersey
1953 establishments in Pennsylvania
Toll bridges in New Jersey
Toll bridges in Pennsylvania
Transportation buildings and structures in Sussex County, New Jersey
Bridges over the Delaware River
Bridges completed in 1953
Bridges in Pike County, Pennsylvania
Truss bridges in the United States
Road bridges in New Jersey
Road bridges in Pennsylvania
Bridges of the United States Numbered Highway System
Steel bridges in the United States
Interstate vehicle bridges in the United States
Montague Township, New Jersey